Elsterwerda (Lower Sorbian: Wikow) is a town in the Elbe-Elster district, in southwestern Brandenburg, Germany. It is situated on the Black Elster river, 48 km northwest of Dresden, and 11 km southeast of Bad Liebenwerda.

History
From 1952 to 1990, Elsterwerda was part of the Bezirk Cottbus of East Germany.

Demography

Gallery

Notable people

 Maria Josepha of Austria (1699–1757), Austrian princess and Queen of Poland
 Hartmut Buschbacher (born 1958), international rowing coach
 Charles of Saxony, Duke of Courland (1733–1796), Saxon prince
 Franciszka Krasińska (1742–1796), Polish noblewoman and morganatic wife of the above 
 Johann Gottlob Theaenus Schneider  (1750–1822), classicist and naturalist, spent his childhood in Elsterwerda 
 Johannes Gillhoff  (1861–1930), teacher and author 
 Erich Straube (1887–1971), officer in WW I and WW II
 Bernd Martin (born 1940), historian, grew up in Elsterwerda
 Siegbert Horn (1950–2016), canoeist, Olympic and World Champion   
 Ralf Minge (born 1960), football player and coach

References

External links
 

Localities in Elbe-Elster